Lee Ji-eun (born May 16, 1993), professionally known as  IU, is a South Korean singer, songwriter and actress.

Film

Television series

Web series

Television shows

Hosting

Video games

References

South Korean filmographies
Filmography